Robert Thomas Campbell (born April 18, 1947) is a former American football wide receiver who played one season for the Pittsburgh Steelers in 1969. Campbell was drafted in the 82nd pick in the 4th round of the 1969 NFL draft by the Pittsburgh Steelers. He played college football at Pennsylvania State University for the Penn State Nittany Lions football team.

References

1947 births
Living people
American football wide receivers
American football return specialists
American football running backs
Pittsburgh Steelers players
Players of American football from New York (state)
People from Johnson City, New York
Penn State Nittany Lions football players